Anthony Joseph "Tony" Bozzella (born November 21, 1965) is the current head coach of the Seton Hall University women's basketball team.

Head Coaching Record

References

1965 births
Living people
American women's basketball coaches
LIU Brooklyn Blackbirds women's basketball coaches
Sportspeople from Glen Cove, New York
Seton Hall Pirates women's basketball coaches
Seton Hall University alumni
Iona Gaels women's basketball coaches
Southampton College